Sir Adolph Tuck, 1st Baronet (1854–1926), for most of his life known as Adolph Tuck, was a Prussian-British fine art publisher and chairman of Raphael Tuck & Sons. He was created a baronet in 1910. It was due to the efforts of Adolph Tuck that the size of the postcard in England was increased to the size allowed by the Universal Postal Union.

Early life
Tuck was born in Prussia in 1854, the second son of Raphael Tuck, and was educated at Elizabeth's Gymnasium in Breslau. The family migrated to London, England, in the 1860s. They were Jewish.

Raphael Tuck & Sons
At the age of fifteen, Tuck joined his father's business, Raphael Tuck & Sons art publishers. By 1879 Tuck had started a series of Christmas card design exhibitions at the Dudley Gallery, but the company was best known as the first to introduce the picture post card to the British Empire. Tuck became a naturalized British subject in 1883 and was created a baronet in 1910.

Family life
Tuck married Jeanetta Flatau in 1882 and they had five children, two sons and three daughters. One of his daughters, Sybil Grace (1887–1979), married the banker and philanthropist Edward Stern (1854–1933), member of the Stern family. Tuck died at his London home at 29 Park Crescent, Portland Place, on 3 July 1926, when his eldest son Major William Reginald Tuck inherited the baronetcy.

References

British businesspeople
1854 births
1926 deaths
British Jews
Baronets in the Baronetage of the United Kingdom